Markel Starks (born February 21, 1991) is an American professional basketball for Darüşşafaka  of the Turkish Basketbol Süper Ligi (BSL). Born in Accokeek, Maryland, he played for Georgetown Prep before enrolling at Georgetown University and playing for the Hoyas.

High school career
Starks attended Georgetown Preparatory School in North Bethesda, Maryland where he played for coach Dwayne Bryant. As a freshman in 2006–07, he averaged 10 points, 5 assists and 3 rebounds per game as he led Prep to a 15-10 record, the IAC Tournament Championship and he was named the conference Freshman of the Year. As a sophomore in 2007–08, he averaged 15 points, 10 assists and 5 rebounds per game as he led Prep to an 18-7 record and the IAC Tournament Championship for the second straight year. He subsequently earned All-IAC and first-team All-Montgomery County honors.

On September 25, 2008, Starks committed to nearby Georgetown University. As a junior in 2008–09, he averaged 22 points, 8 assists and 5 rebounds per game as he earned first-team All-Met, All-Montgomery County and All-IAC honors. As a senior in 2009–10, he averaged 25 points, 8 assists and 5 rebounds per game as he led Prep to an 18-7 record. He subsequently earned first-team All-Met honors, was named to the All-Decade Team in Montgomery County (Md.), was named the county Player of the Year and the IAC Player of the Year.

Starks was a top one-hundred recruit out of Georgetown Prep as he was ranked 76th by ESPN 100 and 80th by Rivals.com. He officially signed with Georgetown University on March 29, 2010.

College career
After an outstanding high school career, Starks joined the Georgetown Hoyas for his freshman season in 2010–11. He appeared in 30 games while averaging 1.5 points, 0.7 assists and 0.6 rebounds in 9.7 minutes per game.

As a sophomore in 2011–12, Starks appeared in 31 games with 25 starting assignments. He was fifth on the team in scoring with 7.1 points per game while he connected on 45.5 percent of his field goals (80-of-176) and 36.7 percent of his three-point field goals (36-of-98). He also averaged 1.6 rebounds and 1.6 assists in 24.4 minutes per game.

As a junior in 2012–13, Starks stepped up his game as he averaged 12.8 points per game which earned him third-team All-Big East honors. In 32 games (all starts), he also averaged 1.8 rebounds, 3.0 assists and 1.3 steals in 34.1 minutes per game.

During Starks′ senior season in 2013–14, head coach John Thompson III gave him 37.0 minutes per game. To Starks' credit, he improved once again, increasing his scoring average to 17.3 points per game despite his field goal percentage dropping from 45.7% as a junior to 41.2% as a senior. He subsequently earned first-team All-Big East and second-team NABC Division I All-District 5 honors. In 33 games (all starts), he also averaged 2.3 rebounds and 4.1 assists per game.

College statistics

|-
| style="text-align:left;"| 2010–11
| style="text-align:left;"| Georgetown
| 30 || 0 || 9.7 || .283 || .257 || .600 || .6 || .7 || .3 || .0 || 1.5
|-
| style="text-align:left;"| 2011–12
| style="text-align:left;"| Georgetown
| 31 || 25 || 24.4 || .455 || .367 || .697 || 1.6 || 1.6 || .6 || .1 || 7.1
|-
| style="text-align:left;"| 2012–13
| style="text-align:left;"| Georgetown
| 32 || 32 || 34.1 || .457 || .417 || .731 || 1.8 || 3.0 || 1.3 || .1 || 12.8
|-
| style="text-align:left;"| 2013–14
| style="text-align:left;"| Georgetown
| 33 || 33 || 37.0 || .412 || .326 || .870 || 2.3 || 4.1 || .9 || .1 || 17.3
|-

Professional career
After going undrafted in the 2014 NBA draft, Starks joined the Detroit Pistons for the Orlando Summer League and the Minnesota Timberwolves for the Las Vegas Summer League. On July 30, 2014, he signed with FMC Ferentino of Italy for the 2014–15 season. In 34 games for Ferentino, he averaged 14.7 points, 2.4 rebounds and 4.0 assists per game.

On August 12, 2015, Starks signed with the Cairns Taipans for the 2015–16 NBL season. On September 28, he was named the joint MVP winner of the 2015 Pre-season Blitz tournament alongside Stephen Holt of Melbourne United. Both players were awarded the Ray Borner MVP Medal for leading their clubs to clean sweeps in the NBL's annual pre-season tournament. Starks helped the Taipans finish the five-day tournament with a 3–0 win–loss record, and over those three games, Starks averaged 13.7 points per game. On October 31, Starks had a season-best game with 27 points and a buzzer beating game-winning three-pointer to lift the Taipans over the line against the Adelaide 36ers, winning the contest 104–101. He bested that performance on December 11, scoring a season-high 33 points in a 103–101 double overtime win over the Illawarra Hawks. Starks appeared in all 16 games to begin the season before a hamstring injury suffered on December 17 ruled him out for two straight games. He returned to action on January 6, 2016, but limped through the rest of the season. Having averaged a serviceable 14.5 points over his first 15 games, his points per game average dropped to 9.7 over his final 11 contests. The Taipans finished the season outside the top four, thus missing the playoffs with a 12–16 win–loss record. Starks appeared in 26 games for the Taipans, averaging 12.5 points, 2.2 rebounds and 2.3 assists per game.

On February 25, 2016, Starks signed with Vanoli Cremona for the rest of the 2015–16 Lega Basket Serie A season, returning to Italy for a second stint.

On August 17, 2019, Starks signed with Avtodor Saratov of the VTB United League. He averaged 14.4 points, 5.9 assists, and 1.2 steals per game. Starks re-signed with the team on June 23, 2020.

On June 20, 2021, he has signed with Igokea of the Adriatic League. Starks averaged 12.6 points, 6.8 assists and 1.8 steals per game.

On January 22, 2022, he signed with Fenerbahçe of the Turkish Basketball Super League (BSL).

On June 18, 2022, he has signed with Darüşşafaka  of the Turkish Basketbol Süper Ligi (BSL).

Personal
Starks is the son of Anthony and Rae Starks, and has a brother, Renard, who attended Virginia Military Institute.

References

External links
Cairns Taipans profile
Georgetown Hoyas bio

1991 births
Living people
ABA League players
American expatriate basketball people in Australia
American expatriate basketball people in Bosnia and Herzegovina
American expatriate basketball people in Germany
American expatriate basketball people in Italy
American expatriate basketball people in Poland
American expatriate basketball people in Russia
American expatriate basketball people in Turkey
American men's basketball players
Basket Ferentino players
Basket Zielona Góra players
Basketball players from Maryland
BC Avtodor Saratov players
Cairns Taipans players
Fenerbahçe men's basketball players
Georgetown Hoyas men's basketball players
Georgetown Preparatory School alumni
KK Igokea players
Koroivos B.C. players
People from Accokeek, Maryland
Piratas de Quebradillas players
Point guards
Skyliners Frankfurt players
Sportspeople from the Washington metropolitan area
Vanoli Cremona players
Yalovaspor BK players